Jack Earls (born August 23, 1932, Woodbury, Tennessee) is an American country and rockabilly singer.

Personal background 
Earls grew up on a farm in Manchester, Tennessee in a family of seven children. He sang as a child and began playing guitar at 16; at 17 he moved to Memphis and formed his first band there in 1949. In 1950, he married and had children, and his music-making was temporarily sidelined.

Career 
In 1954, he formed a new band featuring guitarist Johnny Black (Bill Black's brother). This band recorded a demo at Sam Phillips's recording studio in mid-1955, "A Fool For Lovin' You" (written by Earls himself). Phillips expressed interest but told him he'd need to find a new backing band. Earls had Black move to upright bass, and Warren Gregory took up lead guitar; Danny Wahlquist joined on drums. Their next recording session for Phillips resulted in the songs "Slow Down" and "Hey Jim". Phillips released "Slow Down" on his own Sun Records under the name Jack Earls & the Jimbos, and the song became a regional hit, though Earls was unable to tour behind the record due to family obligations. Earls recorded several further songs for Sun, but none of them were released until many years later.

Earls' contract with Sun expired in what he says to be around September 1966, and despite being contacted by Meteor and King, Earls declined to record, though he did occasionally perform in Memphis until he and his family moved to Detroit in 1963. There he worked for Chrysler Motors, taking a job working as a truck driver. He recorded a few further singles in the 1970s for Olympic Records, none of which attracted attention at the time but have since been re-released on Bear Family Records.

In the 1990s, Earls noted the growing interest in rockabilly in Europe, and traveled to England, where he became a star on the country revival circuit. Subsequently his output was re-released on Bear Family Records, and he toured Europe and America into the 2000s.

Recordings

References

American country singer-songwriters
American rockabilly musicians
Singer-songwriters from Tennessee
Living people
1932 births
People from Woodbury, Tennessee
People from Manchester, Tennessee
Country musicians from Tennessee